Mustjõe is a village in Anija Parish, Harju County in northern Estonia. It has a population of 19 (as of 1 January 2010). It has a station on the Elron rail line.

References

Villages in Harju County